Phú Hiệp is a rural commune of Tam Nông District in Đồng Tháp Province, Vietnam.

References

Populated places in Đồng Tháp province
Communes of Dong Thap province